Izmir Smajlaj (born 29 March 1993) is an Albanian athlete who specialises in the long jump. He won the gold medal at the 2017 European Athletics Indoor Championships in Belgrade, the first gold medal for his country at a major athletics competition, setting a new national and personal record of 8.08 metres in 2017. 

His personal bests in the long jump are:

 8.16 metres outdoors (2021) in Tirana. (new national record)
 8.11 metres outdoors (–0.7 m/s wind, 2019) in Shkodër. (new national record)
 8.08 metres indoors (2017) First place in long jump competition, gold medal at the European Athletics Indoor Championships, Belgrade, Serbia
 7.93 metres indoors (2018) First place in long jump competition, gold medal at the Balkan Indoor Championships, Istanbul, Turkey
 7.89 metres outdoors (2018) First place in long jump competition, gold medal and best olympic athlete of the match at the Albanian Athletics Outdoor Championships, Elbasan, Albania
 7.89 metres outdoors (2018) First place in long jump competition, gold medal and title of "Best athlete male of the competition" at Small States of Europe, Liechtenstein

In addition, in the triple jump, he has a personal best of 16.30 metres outdoors (-0.2 m/s wind; 2016; Elbasan, Albania) and 15.15 metres indoors (2014; Tirana, Albania). All the first three marks are current national records.

International competitions

References

1993 births
Living people
Albanian male long jumpers
Olympic athletes of Albania
Athletes (track and field) at the 2016 Summer Olympics
Athletes (track and field) at the 2015 European Games
World Athletics Championships athletes for Albania
European Games competitors for Albania
Athletes (track and field) at the 2018 Mediterranean Games
Mediterranean Games competitors for Albania
People from Shkodër
Athletes (track and field) at the 2020 Summer Olympics